The Givati Parking Lot dig is an archaeological excavation located in Silwan. It is adjacent to the City of David archaeological site. The dig was conducted by Doron Ben-Ami and Yana Tchekhanovets of the Israel Antiquities Authority and underwritten by the City of David Foundation.

History
Excavations of the former Givati Parking Lot began in 2007. Among the 2007 discoveries is an ancient building believed to have been the palace of Queen Helena of Adiabene.

In 2008 archaeologists uncovered a hoard of 264 gold coins minted at the beginning of the reign of Byzantine emperor Heraclius, between the years 610-613 CE, thus just before the Persian conquest of Jerusalem.

In 2010, the dig produced a small, Roman-era cameo of Cupid.  It is made from onyx.  The cupid is in a "striking" blue on a dark brown ground, he has wings and curly hair.  The round cameo would have been an insert in a piece of jewelry. Cupid’s left hand rests on an overturned torch, symbolizing death, so it was probably a mourning piece.

In November 2015, discovery of a tower and glacis identified as belonging to the Seleucid fortress known as the Acra was announced. According to archaeologists Doron Ben-Ami, Yana Tchekhanovets and Salome Dan Goor they had unearthed a complex of rooms and fortified walls they identified as the Acra. Finds include fortification walls, a watchtower measuring 4 by 20 meters, and a glacis. Bronze arrowheads, lead sling-stones and ballista stones were unearthed at the site, stamped with a trident characteristic to the reign of Antiochus IV Epiphanes. These are indicative of the military nature of the site and the efforts to take it. The finds also included were coins from the reigns of Antiochus Epiphanes through Antiochus VII Sidetes, as well as a multitude of stamped Rhodian amphora handles.

Archaeological architect Leen Ritmeyer disagrees with this identification. He claims the location and north-south orientation of the  fortifications make them part of the defensive walls of what is known today as the City of David and  described by Josephus as the Lower City. This Lower City was fortified by the Seleucids, who built the citadel known as Acra. But in Greek any fortification is called an acra, this is a common noun, not a proper one, thus some confusion as to which fortification each specific ancient description is referring to: the refortified City of David, which Ritmeyer identifies as Josephus' southern part of the Lower City, or the Acra proper, the entirely new fortress. Ritmeyer quotes two primary sources - Antiquities of the Jews 12:252–253 ("he built a citadel [Greek: Acra] in the lower part of the city, for the place was high, and overlooked the temple") and 1 Maccabees 1:34 ("the agent's forces fortified David's City with a very strong wall and powerful towers, and it became their fortress.") Based on these sources, he says (a) there were two distinct fortified structures in the Lower City and (b) the new citadel, the Acra, was higher than the Temple, which it overlooked. Given that the new finds from the Givati Parking Lot are some 200 metres away from the Temple Mount of the Hellenistic period, and at a much lower elevation than the Mount, they could not be part of the Acra that "overlooked the temple".

See also

Excavations at the Temple Mount
Monumental stepped street (1st century CE)
Jerusalem Water Channel, running underneath the monumental stepped street
Ophel Treasure, hidden right before the 614 Persian invasion, same as the Byzantine Givati hoard
Silwan

References

External links
Givati Parking Lot Dig 3D
City of David
Archaeological sites in Jerusalem